Ashley Grimes may refer to:

Ashley Grimes (footballer, born 1957) (born 1957), Irish footballer
Ashley Grimes (footballer, born 1986) (born 1986), English footballer